Zürich railway station, or Zurich railway station, may refer to a number of railway stations:
Zürich Affoltern railway station
Zürich Airport railway station
Zürich Altstetten railway station
Zürich Binz railway station
Zürich Brunau railway station
Zürich Enge railway station
Zürich Friesenberg railway station
Zürich Giesshübel railway station
Zürich Hardbrücke railway station
Zürich Hauptbahnhof railway station
Zürich Leimbach railway station
Zürich Letten railway station
Zürich Manegg railway station
Zürich Oerlikon railway station
Zürich Saalsporthalle-Sihlcity railway station
Zürich Schweighof railway station
Zürich Seebach railway station
Zürich Selnau railway station
Zürich Stadelhofen railway station
Zürich Tiefenbrunnen railway station
Zürich Triemli railway station
Zürich Wiedikon railway station
Zürich Wipkingen railway station
Zürich Wollishofen railway station